These are lists of sentient species from the Star Wars franchise.

 List of Star Wars species (A–E)
 List of Star Wars species (F–J)
 List of Star Wars species (K–O)
 List of Star Wars species (P–T)
 List of Star Wars species (U–Z)

Species
Lists of fictional life forms
Lists of fiction lists